Tihu College, established in 1963, is a general degree college situated in Tihu, Assam. This college is affiliated with the Gauhati University.

Departments

Science
Botany
Chemistry
Computer Science
Physics
Mathematics
Zoology

Arts and Commerce
 Assamese
 English
Sanskrit
History
Education
Economics
Philosophy
Political Science
Geography
Commerce

References

External links
http://www.tihucollege.org

Universities and colleges in Assam
Colleges affiliated to Gauhati University
Educational institutions established in 1963
1963 establishments in Assam